Say it in Russian is a 2007 American/French film, co-written and produced by Kenneth G. Eade, and  starring Rade Šerbedžija, Faye Dunaway and Steven Brand.

Say it in Russian is directed by Jeff Celentano, and edited by William M. Anderson and David Rawlins.  It is produced by Imperia Entertainment, Inc.  The motion picture was one of the first pictures ever successfully finished by a small cap company that trades its stock on the Pink Sheets. The movie has been picked up for distribution by Dalton Pictures and was released on 4 May 2009 in Carmike cinemas.

Plot
Andrew (Steven Brand) meets a young Russian girl, Daria, while on vacation in Europe and falls in love. He goes to Moscow, where he meets Daria's father (Rade Sherbedgia), a rich Russian mafia oligarch, and becomes entwined with his situation, which places them both in grave danger.

References

External links

2007 films
American thriller films
French thriller films
English-language French films
2000s English-language films
2000s thriller films
Films scored by Pinar Toprak
Films directed by Jeff Celentano
2000s American films
2000s French films